Alireza Dehghan (born 27 December 1996) is an Iranian weightlifter who won a gold medal at the 2013 World Youth Championships.

Major results

References

External links
 
 

1996 births
Living people
Iranian male weightlifters
Place of birth missing (living people)
21st-century Iranian people